The 2010 Asian Speed Skating Championships were held between 9 January and 10 January 2010 at the Meiji Hokkaido-Tokachi Oval in Obihiro, Hokkaidō.

Women championships

Day 1

Day 2

Allround Results

Men championships

Day 1

Day 2

Allround Results

References
www.skatingjapan.jp 

Asian Speed Skating Championships
2010 in speed skating
International speed skating competitions hosted by Japan
Sport in Hokkaido
Asian Speed Skating Championships